The Maldivian records in swimming are the fastest ever performances of swimmers from the Maldives, which are recognised and ratified by the Swimming Association of Maldives.

All records were set in finals unless noted otherwise.

Long Course (50 m)

Men

Women

Mixed relay

Short Course (25 m)

Men

Women

Mixed relay

References

External links
 Swimming Association of Maldives web site

Maldives
Records
Swimming